In a real estate context, an option fee is money paid by a Buyer to a Seller for the option to terminate a real estate contract.

Option fee funds should not be confused with earnest money.

The use of option fees is most common in the residential resale market in Texas.

Option fees in Texas
The residential real estate industry in Texas is unique in that the real estate sales contract forms used in most transactions in the state are developed through a state agency, the Texas Real Estate Commission (TREC).  TREC's Broker-Lawyer Committee develops standard contract forms and addenda which are promulgated by the Commission.  While the forms are public records and available for anyone to use, they are intended for use by those persons holding licenses to practice real estate in Texas.  Though the use of these contract forms and addenda is voluntary, they are used in most transactions.

One distinctive feature of residential real estate contract forms promulgated by the Commission is the "termination option."  The termination option paragraph of the contract gives a potential buyer, in return for paying an "option fee" to the seller, the unrestricted right to terminate the contract by giving notice of termination to the seller within a certain number of days after the effective date of the negotiated contract.  The number of days and the amount of the option fee, like sales price and earnest money, are among those features negotiated between a seller and potential buyer in the sale contract; in Texas, option fees typically range from $100 to $200, while earnest money ranges from one to several thousand dollars.  Option fees are paid directly to the seller and are only refundable at closing, while earnest money in Texas is typically paid to and held in escrow by title insurance companies for the seller; earnest money is either paid to the seller or refunded to a potential buyer, depending on a number of factors.

The termination option is popular among homebuyers in Texas because it gives a potential buyer time to fully evaluate the condition of the property and perhaps renegotiate the initial offer based on inspections, needed repairs, or other considerations.  During the option period, buyers may either terminate the contract or proceed to purchase the home.  Sellers not only receive the benefit of the option fee payment, but also avoid jeopardizing a successful sale.  In addition, during the option period, the seller can continue to negotiate and accept back-up offers from other potential buyers.

External links
Texas Real Estate Commission

Real estate in the United States
Property law legal terminology
American legal terminology
Texas law